Platyceps somalicus is a species of snake of the family Colubridae. It is found in Somalia and Ethiopia. It also known as the Ogaden racer, Ogaden whip snake, and Audo racer.

References

Platyceps
Snakes of Africa
Reptiles of Ethiopia
Reptiles of Somalia
Taxa named by George Albert Boulenger
Reptiles described in 1896